MJM Music PL, is a Polish independent record label founded in 1990 in Warsaw by Polskie Radio journalist Andrzej Wojciechowski.

In the early days, founders wife Małgorzata Maliszewska obtained licenses for albums by such artists as Pet Shop Boys, Tina Turner, Joe Cocker, The Rolling Stones and The Eurythmics among others, to be released in Poland. Soon later MJM Music PL represented in Poland major labels EMI, Warner Music Group, BMG, CBS and PolyGram. MJM Music PL at the time signed several home country artists such as Wilki, O.N.A., Myslovitz, Lech Janerka, and Renata Przemyk among others.

In 1995 label was purchased by Sony Music Entertainment Poland. In 2003 Andrzej Wojciechowski with Piotr Mikołajczyk, former employee for EMI Music Poland bought MJM Music PL from Sony and started operating as an independent label.

Artists

Current
 
Carrion
Dolzz
Dwaa
Great Line
Half Light
Izabela Kopeć
Jakub Żak
Janusz Rybiński
Krzysztof Respondek
Lustro
Małgorzata Walewska
Milczenie Owiec
Mistic
Newtones
Piotr Woźniak
Power of Trinity
Sond
Tomasz Korpanty
Werk

Former

Bakshish
Cave
Chłopcy z placu broni
Cytadela
Daab
Farba
Frank Rubel
Hedone
Human
Katy Carr
Lech Janerka
Mancu
Martyna Jakubowicz
Myslovitz
No Limits
O.N.A.
One Million Bulgarians
Opera
Plateau
Renata Przemyk
Robert Gawliński
Skawalker
Strajk
Subway
Tubylcy Betonu
Wilki
Ziyo

References

External links
 Official website

Polish independent record labels